Nirmala Panta, a 13-year-old girl from Kanchanpur, Nepal, was found raped and murdered in a sugarcane field near her home on 27 July 2018, after she had gone missing the day before. The news of the incident went viral on social media and received widespread condemnation. Various justice campaigns and mass protests were organised throughout the country in the subsequent days and months to put pressure on the government and the police. On 20 August, Kanchanpur District Police Office had presented a suspect. However, locals refused to accept him as the culprit and demanded his release, accusing the police of framing him.

Panta's body had been found stripped bare, and the autopsy concluded that she had been raped and cause of death cited as  "throttling leading to asphyxia and death". The first investigation carried out by the local police and a team from the Crime Investigation Bureau (CIB) drew widespread criticism for its methods and conduct.

Incident
On Thursday, 26 July 2018, a ninth-grade school student, Nirmala Panta of Bhimdattanagar-2, left her home to study at her friend's (family name: Bam). MyRepublica reported that she went to Bam's, one and a half kilometres away from her home, at around 11a.m., and spent three hours there. She left at around 3p.m. but  did not reach back home. Panta's family attempted to file a missing person's complaint at the local police station but were instructed to return the next morning. On Friday, 27 July 2018, Panta's dead body was found naked in a waterlogged sugarcane field in Nimbukheda, Bhimdattanagar-18, about 500metres from Bam's house.

Investigation
Panta's body was sought out after her bicycle was spotted in the sugarcane field by the side of the road. Based on preliminary investigation, the local police stated that she was murdered after being raped. The CIB (Crime Investigation Bureau) team led by Deputy Superintendent of Police (DSP) Angur G.C. began the investigation upon reaching Kanchanpur, four days after the incident. Kanchanpur Police and the CIB team named a 41-year-old local man, who had previously served a nine-year jail sentence for the murder of his brother-in-law, as the suspect. Police claimed that he had confessed to the crime multiple times under interrogation. He was released on 12 September after his DNA did not match samples from the victim. The locals, including Panta's family, launched violent protests alleging that he was innocent and maliciously framed by the police to protect the real culprits. The Bam sisters, Panta's friend and her sister, were arrested on 23 August 2018, based on protesters' demand; they were also released after legal consultation with District Attorney's Office. Panta's friend was released under the condition that she should present herself to the police upon demand while her sister was released under bail of Rs 30,000.

Hari Prasad Mainali, Director General of Department of Prison Management, led a committee formed on 23 August 2018, by the Nepalese government to investigate the incident. Kanchanpur Police Chief, Superintendent of Police (SP) Dilli Raj Bista and Chief District Officer (CDO) Kumar Bahadur Khadka were summoned to Kathmandu, and were replaced by new officials. The incident also resulted in the suspension of DSPs Gyan Bahadur Sethi and Angur GC, Inspectors Ekendra Khadka and Jagadish Bhatta, and Assistant Sub-inspector (ASI) Ram Singh Dhami, by the Ministry of Home Affairs.  On 17 September 2018, nine police officials were interrogated over their involvement in the investigation of the case, which included SP Dilli Raj Bista. However, Birendra K.C. quit the Home Ministry investigation panel citing threats from the group trying to undermine the investigation. As per the spokesperson of Nepal Police, SSP Shailesh Thapa Kshetri, DNA samples from SP Bista, his son, and the nephew of the mayor of Bhimdatta had been taken, together with the vaginal swab of the victim, for further investigation, but none of them matched. On 17 September 2018, a new investigative committee was set up by the Nepal Police under DIG (Deputy Inspector General of Police) Dhiru Basnyat to replace the former investigation committee led by SSP Uttam Subedi. On the same day, Prime Minister Khadga Prasad Sharma Oli asserted that the local police had derailed the investigation. He speculated that either the police had faked the investigation or had committed mistakes in the investigation. The Panta family travelled 35 hours by bus to Kathmandu to draw the attention of the central government to the case. Oli assured the family that the perpetrator would be prosecuted and punished irrespective of his money, power, post, or influences.

On 18 September 2018, the Kanchanpur police chief SP Kuber Kathayat admitted that there was no concrete evidence, and that the investigation was ongoing. The government had earlier set up an investigative panel due to the destruction of evidence by the local investigating police after the discovery of the body of the victim. DIG Dhiru Basnyat, who was appointed as the leading officer to a nine-member probe committee formed on 16 September 2018, for the new investigation, stated that the investigation would be begun anew.

The Central Investigation Bureau, in December 2018, arrested one of Panta's neighbours, from Kathmandu. One of his friends was also called to the bureau from Kanchanpur for interrogation. According to police sources, both Inspector General of Police Sarbendra Khanal and chief of the bureau Deputy Inspector General Niraj Bahadur Shahi personally interrogated both men. According to the police, they confessed to Panta's rape and murder. However, neither of their DNAs matched the sample collected from Panta's vaginal swab, and they were both released. They have since accused the police of torturing them, a charge the police has denied.

DNA tests
According to a report by the National Human Rights Commission, there were serious lapses in DNA collection, due to which a correct result could not be obtained. The DNA sample was collected into a test tube from three layers of a vaginal swab. But the commission report says that the extraction provided an insufficient sample of the DNA, which could also have been damaged. The report also found flaws in the scientific method applied to the DNA test. The commission recommended using methods of investigation other than DNA testing. Another technical committee to investigate DNA led by Jiwan Rijal also concluded that the said male component of sample taken from victim's body might be contaminated and may not be of the perpretator. It also questioned the validity of the lab's report that sperm was found in the sample.

Reaction and protests
The murder sparked public outrage on social media, and public demonstrations. Prime Minister Oli, in a meeting with the victim's parents and lawmakers of Sudurpashchim Province, gave assurances that justice would be delivered. During public demonstrations in Bhimdattanagar, one boy died in clashes with police forces.

Public protests
 On Friday evening, 27 July 2018, the students of the Nepal Student Union demonstrated and shut down the Bazaar area of Bhimdatta, which resulted in a clash with security personnel.
 On Saturday, 28 July 2018, the victim's family, together with local civilians, a women's rights organization, and sister organizations of the opposition party Nepali Congress, protested the failure of police to find the culprits and demanded security be established at the incident site. On Saturday, the victim's family and relatives staged demonstrations at the Mahakali Zonal Hospital, the Bazaar Area, and the municipal corporation.
 On 23 August 2018, locals in Kanchanpur staged demonstrations, shut down the market, and burned tyres to protest the failure of police to find the real culprits. Demonstrations had been ongoing in Bhimdatta, Bhansi, Suda, Lalpur, Sisaiya, Daiji, Champhapur and adjacent areas since the incident.
 On 15 September 2018, a mass rally was organized at Maitighar Mandala, Kathmandu, with the slogan of Justice for Nirmala. The rally converged on a corner assembly at New Baneshwor.
 On Tuesday, 18 September 2018, the Nepali Congress organized a rally at Mahendranagar, which was joined by Panta's parents, demanding the identification and punishment of the perpetrator of the incident. They submitted a memorandum of demand to the Chief District Officer of Kanchanpur, Taranath Adhikari.
 On the same day, students of the Janajyoti Multiple Campus of Sarlahi district organized a rally at Lalbandi, Sarlahi, where hundreds of students, civil society leaders, political leaders, and women's rights activists demanded justice for the victim.
 On 30 October 2018, family, friends, relatives and human rights activists led a rally in Mahendranagar demanding justice for the victim and punitive actions against SP Dilli Raj Bista and Inspector Jagadish Prasad Bhatta.

References

External links 
 Nirmala Panta post-mortem report, Nayapatrika (pdf)

Rape in Nepal
2018 crimes in Nepal
Murder in Nepal
July 2018 events in Asia
Sex crimes
People murdered in Nepal
2018 murders in Asia
Deaths by person in Nepal
People from Kanchanpur District
2010s murders in Nepal
Incidents of violence against girls
Violence against women in Nepal